Isaiah Turner (1876 – 1936) was an English footballer who played in the Football League for Stoke and West Bromwich Albion.

Career
Turner played for Dudley St James before playing in a Football League match for West Bromwich Albion in 1898. Afterwards he spent time playing for Stourbridge, Dudley Town and Kidderminster Harriers before re-entering league football with Stoke in 1906. Turner played in seven league matches for Stoke during the 1906–07 as the club were relegated. He left at the end of the season and went on to play for Worcester City and Old Hill Wanderers.

Career statistics

References

1876 births
1936 deaths
People from the Metropolitan Borough of Dudley
English footballers
Association football goalkeepers
West Bromwich Albion F.C. players
Stourbridge F.C. players
Dudley Town F.C. players
Kidderminster Harriers F.C. players
Stoke City F.C. players
Worcester City F.C. players
Old Hill Wanderers F.C. players
English Football League players